Bethany High School is located in Bethany, Oklahoma, United States. The first class graduated in 1931. In the 2014 Bethany High School won the National Blue Ribbon Award. The school mascot is a broncho.

History 
Bethany Public Schools was organized as School District No. 88 on December 27, 1910. Among its first trustees were J.W. Vawter and U.D.T. Murray, father of Wm. H. Murray, former governor of Oklahoma. Bonds were voted in the amount of $2,000 to erect the first building, a concrete-block, one-room structure, in 1910–11. This district was carved from a very small existing school. For a while, the school could support only one teacher, but by the 1914–15 term, the enrollment had increased to 89. This necessitated the creation of another room and the employment of a second teacher. In 1927-28 two years of high school credits were offered. Two years later, the high school offered all four years of credits and the first graduating class was in the spring of 1931. In the 2014 Bethany High School won the National Blue Ribbon Award. Construction began In the 2016 school year on new classrooms, a S.T.E.M Building, and the Dr. Kent Shellenberger Performing Arts Center and was completed in 2017.

Notable alumni
Chris Chamberlain, a free agent linebacker
Shannon Lucid, a biochemist and NASA astronaut
Robert Hale, an opera singer
David Busic, the general superintendent for the Church of the Nazarene

Athletic achievements 

 In 2001, the Bethany Broncho basketball team won the class 3A state basketball title, beating Eufaula High School 57 to 55. That season the Bronchos finished 24–5.
 In 2003, the Bethany Broncho football team won the Oklahoma class 2A state football title, beating the Davis Wolves 40–6 at Owen Field in Norman, Oklahoma. The Bronchos were led by Little All City player of the year Chris Chamberlain.
 In 2010–2011, Cheer won the National Champion title in March at a Jamfest cheer competition. Bethany Cheer qualified for the Oklahoma Secondary School Achievement Association Cheer State Competition.
 In 2010–2011, the football team made it to the semi-finals.
 In 2011–2012, the softball team become the first girls team to qualify for the state tournament.
 In 2012, the women's soccer team won their district championships and played for the state championship, losing to Verdigris 4–1.
 In 2013, the Soccer team made it to the state semi-finals.
 In 2014, the track and field team finished fifth at state in class 4A.
 In 2015, the pom team won a state championship in the category of 4A Jazz.
 In 2016, men's soccer and baseball made it to the state semi-finals
 In 2016, the men's cross country team won regionals for the first time in school history and at state finished 3rd which is the highest finish in school history.
 In 2018, the varsity football team made it to finals for the 4A state football title against in-season opponent Tuttle.

Extracurricular activities 
Bethany High School has a wide variety of extracurricular activities for the student body to get involved in including Key Club, Spanish Club, Student Council, National Honor Society, Young Democrats, Young Republicans, Book Club, Robotics Club, Art Club, Speech & Debate, Show Choir, Band, and Orchestra.

Each spring Bethany Public Schools produces an "All-School" musical drawing in students from 5th to 12th grade. Some of the musicals done in recent years include The Little Mermaid, and The Music Man.

References

External links 
Bethany Public Schools

Public high schools in Oklahoma
Schools in Oklahoma County, Oklahoma
Educational institutions established in 1910
1910 establishments in Oklahoma